Robert James Sullivan (November 29, 1957 – May 24, 2018) was a Canadian professional ice hockey player who played 62 games in the National Hockey League. He played for the Hartford Whalers. Prior to joining the NHL, Sullivan played in the American Hockey League and International Hockey League, winning the Dudley "Red" Garrett Memorial Award as the rookie of the year in the American Hockey League in 1981–82.

Career statistics

Regular season and playoffs

References

External links

1957 births
2018 deaths
Anglophone Quebec people
Asiago Hockey 1935 players
Atlanta Flames draft picks
Binghamton Whalers players
Canadian expatriate ice hockey players in Italy
Canadian ice hockey left wingers
Chicoutimi Saguenéens (QMJHL) players
EHC Lustenau players
Hartford Whalers players
Ice hockey people from Quebec
Montreal Bleu Blanc Rouge players
Montreal Juniors players
New Haven Nighthawks players
New York Rangers draft picks
Sportspeople from Rouyn-Noranda
Toledo Goaldiggers players